Railroad and Transportation Museum of El Paso is a railroad museum in El Paso, Texas, United States.

Facilities
The museum is operating an exhibit adjacent to historic 1857 locomotive No.1 of the El Paso & Southwestern located in the Union Plaza Transit Terminal, just south of the Civic Center. Displays demonstrate how transportation enhanced the development of business and industry in this region. In addition to an education program, the museum will maintain a library, a study center and an oral history collection.

Associates and supporters of the museum
Southwest Chapter, Railway & Locomotive Historical Society
Railroad Model and Historical Association of El Paso
El Paso & Southwestern Modular Railroad Association
Paso Del Norte Streetcar Preservation Society
Grand International Auxiliary to the Brotherhood of Locomotive Engineers
National Association of Retired and Veteran Railway Employees
El Paso County Historical Society

See also
El Paso, Texas
El Paso & Southwestern Railroad No. 1

External links
Railroad and Transportation Museum of El Paso
Locomotive No. 1 Slideshow
Visit to the Museum

References
Picture of Locomotive No. 1
 Rail Photo Art
 Proclamation for sesquicentennial
 Legislative Library
 El Paso Mayor's proclamation
 Restoration of the Locomotive
 Senate Proclamation

Museums in El Paso, Texas
Railroad museums in Texas
Museums established in 2006